Lopburi is the capital city of Lopburi Province in Thailand. It has a population of 58,000. The town (thesaban mueang) covers the whole tambon Tha Hin and parts of Thale Chup Son of Mueang Lopburi District, a total area of 6.85 km2.

Etymology
It was originally known as Lavo or Lavapura, meaning "city of Lava" in reference to the ancient South Asian city of Lavapuri (present-day Lahore, Pakistan).

History

The city has a history dating back to the Dvaravati period more than 1,000 years ago. According to the Northern Chronicles, Lavo was founded by Phraya Kalavarnadishraj, who came from Takkasila in 648 CE. According to Thai records, Phraya Kakabatr from Takkasila (it is assumed that the city was Tak or Nakhon Chai Si) set the new era, Chula Sakarat in 638 CE, which was the era used by the Siamese and the Burmese until the 19th century. His son, Phraya Kalavarnadishraj founded the city a decade later.  Lopburi, or Lavapura as it then was, was under the rule of the rising Angkor regime and became one of the most important centers in the Chao Phraya Basin from then on. Epigraphic evidence indicates that the dominant population of the city was Mon.

The earliest confirmed occurrence of the name Lavapura is on silver coins inscribed "lava" on the obverse and "pura" on the reverse in a Pallava-derived script of the seventh or eighth century; several such coins were recovered in 1966 from a hoard found in an ancient jar in U Thong.

Inscriptions say that Lopburi was incorporated into the administration structure of the Khmer Empire during the reign of Suryavarman I.  Control of Lopburi gave the Khmer Empire access to trade going through the Kra Isthmus.
There is some evidence the Khmer Empire, under Suryavarman II, fought against the Mons in the 12th century over suzerainty.  Lopburi sent embassies to China in 1115 and 1155.

Lopburi (Lavo) is described in Book III of Marco Polo's Travels, where it is called Locach. This came from the Chinese (Cantonese) pronunciation of Lavo, "Lo-huk". The city is referred to as "Lo-ho" in chapter 20 of the History of Yuan (元史 : Yuán Shǐ), the official history of the Mongol, or Yuan Dynasty of China. Due to a scribal error in Book III of Marco Polo's travels treating of the route southward from Champa, where the name Java was substituted for Champa as the point of departure, Java Minor was 1,300 miles to the south of Java Major, instead of from Champa, on or near an extension of the Terra Australis. As explained by Sir Henry Yule, the editor of an English edition of Marco Polo's Travels: "Some geographers of the 16th century, following the old editions which carried the travellers south-east of Java to the land of Boeach (or Locac), introduced in their maps a continent in that situation".

After the foundation of the Ayutthaya Kingdom in the 14th century, Lopburi was a stronghold of Ayutthaya's rulers. It became the capital of the kingdom during the reign of King Narai the Great in the mid-17th century and the king resided there about eight months a year.

Archeological finds 

 several flaked stone tools were discovered in Ban Mi district  dated back to the Paleolithic Age  in 1931.
 a number of tools, human burial sites and bronze accessories belong to Iron Age were found in Lop Buri river Basin in 1964.
 Bracelets and beads dated back 2700–3500 years were revealed at Ban Khok Charoen in 1966–1970.
 Prehistoric human skeletons and clay jugs were found in Ban Tha Kae in 1979.
 A Copper source was discovered in Khao Wong Phrachan in 1986–1994.

Geography 

Climate
Lopburi has a tropical savanna climate (Köppen climate classification Aw). Winters are dry and very warm. The monsoon season runs from late April through October, with heavy rain and somewhat cooler temperatures during the day, although nights remain warm.

Transportation
The main road through Lobpuri is Route 1 (Phahonyothin Road), which starts in Bangkok, and continues through Lopburi, Chai Nat, Nakhon Sawan, Kamphaeng Phet, Tak, Lampang, Chiang Rai, and the border with Burma at Mae Sai. Route 311 leads west to Sing Buri, and Route 3196 leads south-west to Ang Thong.

Lopburi is a station of the State Railway of Thailand's Northern Line, forming the end of Bangkok's suburban service. Train service from Bangkok railway station (Hua Lamphong) in Bangkok usually takes about 2 hours. The third class train costs less than $1 and is a great way to experience the local culture and the "Real Thailand".

Culture
Today the city is best known for the thousands of crab-eating macaques (Macaca fascicularis) that live in the middle of the city, especially around the Khmer temple, Prang Sam Yot and a Khmer shrine, Sarn Phra Karn. It is suspected that urban expansion caused the monkeys to adapt to city life. They are fed by the local people, especially during the Monkey Festival. This festival usually occurs on the last Sunday of November.  The monkeys can be aggressive, are not afraid of humans, and often steal whatever items or food they can find from unwary visitors. Most of the hotels and guesthouses in Lopburi are "monkey-proofed", using screen wire, or by screwing the windows shut.

In the city signs are posted reading: 

During the 2020–21 COVID-19 pandemic, lack of tourists prompted hungry monkeys to harass local residents.

References

External links

Populated places in Lopburi province
Cities and towns in Thailand
Populated places established in the 1st millennium